Iranian Youth Cinema Society (IYCS) is an Iranian non-profit educational film institution established in 1976. IYCS is associated with the Iranian Ministry of Culture and has 60 branches around the country; the main branch is located in Tehran. IYCS also trains students to specialize in cinema.

IYCS organizes Tehran International Short Film Festival (TISFF) every year in October, which is an Academy Awards (Oscars) qualifying film festival.

In 2020, the organization began to release short films online.

IYCS produces numerous short films every year and supports their presentation at international film festivals. For example, in 2022, IYCS participated in Shanghai International Film Festival, presenting Iranian movies.

References 

1976 establishments in Iran
Film organisations in Iran
Youth organizations established in 1976
Arts organizations established in 1976
Youth organisations based in Iran
Non-profit organisations based in Iran